Svenja Schlicht (born 26 June 1967 in Neumünster) is a German former swimmer who competed in the 1984 Summer Olympics and in the 1988 Summer Olympics.

References

1967 births
Living people
German female swimmers
Female backstroke swimmers
Olympic swimmers of West Germany
Swimmers at the 1984 Summer Olympics
Swimmers at the 1988 Summer Olympics
Olympic silver medalists for West Germany
World Aquatics Championships medalists in swimming
European Aquatics Championships medalists in swimming
Medalists at the 1984 Summer Olympics
Olympic silver medalists in swimming
People from Neumünster
Sportspeople from Schleswig-Holstein
20th-century German women
21st-century German women